Valery Rodevich (born 26 April 1980) is a Belarusian rower. He competed at the 2004 Summer Olympics and the 2008 Summer Olympics.

References

External links
 

1980 births
Living people
Belarusian male rowers
Olympic rowers of Belarus
Rowers at the 2004 Summer Olympics
Rowers at the 2008 Summer Olympics
People from Mogilev
Sportspeople from Mogilev Region